The Connect World Tour, also known as Monsta X World Tour: The Connect, is the second worldwide concert tour by the South Korean boy group Monsta X following their successful and sold out world tour for the previous year Beautiful World Tour. The tour commenced on May 26, exactly two months after the release of the group's sixth EP The Connect: Dejavu, kicking off in Seoul, and visiting twelve more countries including United Kingdom, Netherlands, Spain, Thailand, Hong Kong, Taiwan, United States, Mexico, Argentina, Chile, Brazil, and Japan.

Background

Asia
On February 22, their second world tour was announced, including eighteen cities, having their first show held in Seoul at Jangchung Arena on May 26 and 27. On April 13, Starship Entertainment revealed that the tickets for the two days Seoul concert had sold out within a minute upon the release on April 12 for three consecutive years.

For this tour, Monsta X collaborated with Swarovski for their specially tailored jackets. The total number of Swarovski crystals used for their jackets amounted to 500,000 for eleven outfits that were created by hand for the group.

Before the concert on June 30 in Bangkok, they visited local TV shows and held a press conference to promote their album and concert. The press conference was held on April 29 at the GCP Hall of the Grande Centre Point Hotel in Sukhumvit 55 and more than 100 reporters from local TV channels, radios and major newspapers covered the event, including Thai media channels such as Daily News, True Music, Tofupop Radio, and True Inside that had separate interviews with Monsta X. In addition, the TV channels such as Channel 3, Channel 7, and Channel 9, also newspapers such as Daily News, Kom Chad Luek, Kapook, Sanook, and Mthai joined the conference. On that same day, Monsta X also appeared through the program Rueng Lao Chao Nee of Thailand's national television channel, Channel 3.

On August 25 and 26, Monsta X completed their two days encore concert held at SK Olympic Handball Gymnasium in Seoul where they were greeted by over 10,000 fans.

The group was initially scheduled for eighteen cities and twelve countries for the tour but Japan was added for a four-day concert starting from October 5 to October 7 in Chiba and October 10 in Osaka.

Europe
In May, after Monsta X began their tour in Seoul, they headed to Europe. The group were in London on June 17, in Amsterdam on June 20, and in Madrid on June 23. Their tour in Europe gathered over 15,000 fans who came all over the continent to see the boys.

In Europe, the concert brought the group media attention, including coverage by UK’s daily newspapers The Guardian and Metro.

Americas
Monsta X held the tour around the United States of America, which started on July 20 at Rosemont Theatre in Chicago then ended on August 3 at Microsoft Theater in Los Angeles. During their stay, they had sold out shows and interviews, with local and nationwide TV programs such as BUILD Series, FOX5's Good Day New York, Access Hollywood, and FOX 11's Good Day L.A., popular magazines such as Billboard and Allure, also internet and radio shows such as BuzzFeed, 102.3 KIIS-FM's Jojo on the Radio, 104.3 MYFM’s Valentine in the Morning, Radio Disney, Wild 94.9, Rhythm 105.9, iHeartRadio's ON With Mario Lopez, and Q 106.1's The Zach Sang Show. They ended their North American leg on August 5 in Mexico. 

The group was able to film for the Viki Original mini music documentary When You Call My Name featuring Gallant during the tour in North America.

After the North American leg, the group went to South America, beginning on August 8 in Argentina, followed by August 10 in Chile, and end it on August 12 in Brazil.

Critical reception
Caroline Sullivan of The Guardian gave them  and praised Monsta X's performance in London, noting that they are "a group that is skilled in singing, rapping, and dancing among various musical genres".

Sarah Deen of Metro gave them  and described Monsta X's performance as "spectacular", giving their all in performing and very dedicated to their fans, also commending the group's "uniqueness", calling them "chameleons" for being "convincing and unforced when trying out different concepts", owning every one.

Commercial performance
The tour gathered 10,675 attendees, with a gross sales of $1,317,823 for three reported shows out of twenty-one total shows. According to Maeil Business Newspaper, the tour gathered an estimated total of 102,493 attendees (not including Japan), which accumulated an estimated total revenue of ,270,000,000.

Setlist

INTRO VCR
 "Jealousy"                                                                         
 "Be Quiet"                                                                                      
 "Beautiful" 
MENT                                                                                                                                           
 "Gravity"                                                                         
 "Tropical Night"
MENT                                                                                     
 "Blind"                                                                                                
 "Crazy In Love"                                              
 "All In"  
VCR                                                                                                                                                         
 "I Do Love U" – Kihyun, Minhyuk, and Wonho                  
 "Versace on the Floor" – Shownu and Jooheon              
 "How Long" – Hyungwon                                    
 "Impossible" – I.M                                          
 "Baby Shark" – Hyungwon and I.M
 "Fake Love" – Hyungwon and I.M                                                                                                                                                                             
 "In Time" 
MENT 
 "From Zero"
 "Because of U"  

       
MENT                                                               
 "White Love" 
 "Roller Coaster"
VCR
 "Lost In The Dream"
 "Blue Moon"
MENT
 "Destroyer"
 "Shine Forever"
MENT 
 "Rush"
 "Special"
 "Trespass" (Rock ver.)
MENT
 "Dramarama"
ENCORE
 "Fallin'"
ENDING MENT
 "If Only" 

Notes:
 included in the Seoul setlist only
 included in the International setlist only
Japan had a different setlist which included Japanese songs

Tour dates

Boxscore

References

External links
  

Monsta X concert tours
2018 concert tours
K-pop concerts
Concert tours of Asia
Concert tours of Japan
Concert tours of Mexico
Concert tours of North America
Concert tours of South Korea
Concert tours of Thailand
Concert tours of the United States